Ilsenburg (Harz) was a Verwaltungsgemeinschaft ("collective municipality") in the district of Harz, in Saxony-Anhalt, Germany. The seat of the Verwaltungsgemeinschaft was in Ilsenburg. It was disbanded in July 2009.

The Verwaltungsgemeinschaft Ilsenburg consisted of the following municipalities:

 Darlingerode 
 Drübeck 
 Ilsenburg

Former Verwaltungsgemeinschaften in Saxony-Anhalt